Dinnington Athletic F.C. was the name of an English football club based in Dinnington, Rotherham, South Yorkshire.

History 
The club was formed in 1928 and quickly overtook Dinnington Main as the prominent club in the village. They initially played in the Worksop & District League but soon moved to the Sheffield Association League. They won the prestigious Sheffield & Hallamshire Senior Cup in 1932 by beating South Kirkby Colliery in Mexborough.

Their finest hour came in the 1934–35 season, when they won the Association League and reached the 1st Round of the FA Cup, losing 1–3 to Chester. The club decided to join the Yorkshire League in 1936, but three years later the Second World War broke out and the league was suspended. After hostilities ended Athletic re-joined the Association League before the Yorkshire League was re-started in 1949. They were promoted to Division One in 1950 but resigned from the league a year later after finishing third from bottom of the table.

Throughout the 1950s and 1960s they competed in local Worksop and Sheffield leagues before rejoining the Yorkshire League in 1969. This latest spell in the competition would again only be a short one – after winning the Division Two title in 1970 they would last only four more years before resigning from the competition and disbanding.

Notable former players 
Players that have played in the Football League either before or after playing for Dinnington Athletic –

 Alf Hale
 Geoff Marlow
 John Nock
 Wally Quinton

League and cup history

Honours

League 
 Yorkshire League Division Two
 Champions: 1969–70
 Promoted: 1949–50
 Yorkshire League Division Three
 Promoted: 1973–74, 1976–77 (champions)

Cup 
 Sheffield & Hallamshire Senior Cup
 Winners: 1931–32
 Runners-up: 1946–47, 1969–70
 Aston-cum-Aughton Charity Cup
 Winners: 1928–29, 1935–36

Records 
 Best FA Cup performance: 1st Round, 1934–35
 Best FA Trophy performance: 1st Qualifying Round, 1970–71, 1971–72

References 

Defunct football clubs in England
Defunct football clubs in South Yorkshire
Sheffield Association League
Yorkshire Football League
Doncaster & District Senior League